Scopula ochreolata is a moth of the  family Geometridae. It is found in Peru.

References

Moths described in 1905
ochreolata
Moths of South America